Georg Stefan Troller (born December 10, 1921 in Vienna, Austria) is an interviewer, director and screenwriter living in Paris. In 1938 Troller fled Austria from the Nazis, first to Czechoslovakia and from there on to France, where he was interned as an enemy alien. In 1941 he obtained a visa for the USA in Marseille. His parents were able to escape via Portugal. In the USA, he was drafted into military service in 1943 and participated in the liberation and documentation of the Dachau concentration camp on April 29, 1945, as well as the capture of Munich on May 1. He was stationed in Europe until 1946 and worked for the Rot-Weiß-Rot radio station operated by the US forces. Back in the USA, Troller studied English at the University of California and theater at Columbia University. In 1949, a Fulbright scholarship for the Sorbonne brought Troller to Paris, where he became a correspondent for RIAS. Troller rose to fame with his program Pariser Journal, which aired from 1962 to 1971 on ARD. In 1971 he launched his series of unconventional interviews Personenbeschreibung for ZDF. His screenplays, directed by Axel Corti, have all become cult films.

Awards 
 1966: Goldene Kamera
 1967: Adolf-Grimme-Preis
 1967: Golden Nymph of the Monte-Carlo Television Festival
 1968: Berliner Kunstpreis
 1969: Adolf-Grimme-Preis
 1973: Adolf-Grimme-Preis
 1975: Dr. Erich Salomon Award
 1986: Award of the Eduard Rhein Foundation
 1987: Golden Nymph of the Monte-Carlo Television Festival
 1987: Adolf-Grimme-Preis
 1987: Academy Award (nomination)
 1990: Bambi Award
 1991: Special Honour of the Adolf-Grimme-Preis
 1991: Honorary professorship of the State of Bavaria
 2002: Cross of Merit of the Federal Republic of Germany 1st Class
 2014: Schiller Prize of the City of Mannheim
 2017: Grand Decoration of Honour for Services to the Republic of Austria
 2021: Great Cross of Merit of the Federal Republic of Germany 1st Class

External links

References 

1921 births
Living people
German-language film directors